Desmond Ferguson (born July 22, 1977, in Lansing, Michigan) is an American former professional basketball player and coach. He last played with the Halifax Rainmen of the PBL. He attended and played college basketball at the University of Missouri as a freshman and his last three seasons at the University of Detroit Mercy.

He was signed by the National Basketball Association's Portland Trail Blazers to a 10-day contract in March 2004, and appeared in seven games with them during the 2003-04 NBA season. He was later taken by the Charlotte Bobcats during the 2004 NBA Expansion Draft and was waived sometime before the season began. Ferguson only played in the NBA for 2 weeks with his final game ever being on April 14, 2004 in a 105 - 104 loss to the Los Angeles Lakers. The game went to double-overtime but Ferguson only played for 3 and half minutes total and recorded 3 points.

Ferguson was a two-time All-Continental Basketball Association (CBA) First Team selection in 2007 and 2008.

Ferguson retired from playing in 2011, becoming a high school coach at his alma mater, Everett High School in Lansing. He left that post in 2017 to focus on his business interests.

Notes

External links
NBA stats @ Basketball-Reference.com
Manchester Millrats roster

1977 births
Living people
African-American basketball players
American expatriate basketball people in Bulgaria
American expatriate basketball people in Canada
American expatriate basketball people in Germany
American expatriate basketball people in Spain
American expatriate basketball people in the Dominican Republic
American expatriate basketball people in the Netherlands
American expatriate basketball people in the Philippines
American men's basketball players
Basketball players from Michigan
Charlotte Bobcats expansion draft picks
Detroit Mercy Titans men's basketball players
Flint Fuze players
Great Lakes Storm players
High school basketball coaches in Michigan
Missouri Tigers men's basketball players
Portland Trail Blazers players
Rockford Lightning players
Small forwards
Sportspeople from Lansing, Michigan
Undrafted National Basketball Association players
Yakama Sun Kings players
Barangay Ginebra San Miguel players
Philippine Basketball Association imports
21st-century African-American sportspeople
20th-century African-American sportspeople